The ACW Junior Heavyweight Championship was a secondary professional wrestling championship title in the American independent promotion Assault Championship Wrestling. The first-ever champion was Tiger Mulligan who defeated Shockwav, and Frankie Starz in a Four Corners match in Meriden, Connecticut on August 24, 2001. The championship was regularly defended throughout the state of Connecticut, most often in Meriden, Connecticut, but also in New Britain and Waterbury, Connecticut until the promotion closed in early-2004.

Jim Nastic holds the record for most reigns as a 2-time champion. At 211 days, Eddie Edwards' reign is the longest in the title's history. Jim Nastic's first reign, which lasted only 24 days, was the shortest in the history of the title. Overall, there have been 8 reigns shared between 7 wrestlers, with one vacancy.

Title history

Reigns

Combined reigns

References

External links
Official ACW Junior Heavyweight Championship Title History
ACW Junior Heavyweight Championship at Genickbruch.com

Junior heavyweight wrestling championships